Ganapath - Part 1 is an upcoming Indian Hindi-language  science fiction action thriller film directed by Vikas Bahl, who produced it under Good Co in association with Jackky Bhagnani, Vashu Bhagnani and Deepshikha Deshmukh under Pooja Entertainment. It stars Tiger Shroff in the titular role with Amitabh Bachchan and Kriti Sanon. The film is touted to be India's first dystopian and futuristic action thriller film which serves as the first part in a planned five part series.

The film was announced in November 2020 and underwent a long, heavy pre-production stage. Principal photography commenced in November 2021 and wrapped up in May 2022. The shooting took place in the United Kingdom, Ladakh and Mumbai. Being made on a budget of between 330–345 Crores, it is one of the most expensive Indian films ever made. The film incorporates heavy VFX and CGI work because of its futuristic concept, which prolonged the post-production works.

Ganapath - Part 1 was initially planned to release in December 2022, but was postponed. It is now scheduled for theatrical release on 20 October 2023, coinciding with Dussehra. A sequel titled Roar & Revolt is scheduled to release on 13 October 2025.

Cast
 Amitabh Bachchan
 Tiger Shroff as Ganapath
 Kriti Sanon as Jassi
 Elli AvrRam as Rosie
 Rahman

Production

Development
The film was announced on 6 November 2020 by Pooja Entertainment, to be directed by Vikas Bahl starring Tiger Shroff.

Filming
The principal photography began on 6 November 2021 in United Kingdom. In May 2022, the final schedule was held in Ladakh.

Release
The film was initially supposed to release of 23 December 2022, during the Christmas Eve, but was later postponed. The film is now scheduled for a theatrical release on 20 October 2023 during Dussehra with dubbed versions in Tamil, Telugu, Malayalam and Kannada languages.

References

External links
 

Upcoming Indian films
Upcoming Hindi-language films
Indian action thriller films